Oak Hill is a town in Wilcox County, Alabama, United States. According to the 1940 U.S. Census, it incorporated in 1938. Per the 2020 census, the population was 14. It is the smallest incorporated town in Alabama as of 2020, succeeding McMullen. The smallest unincorporated census-designated place in the state is also located in Wilcox County, that of Catherine, which had 22 residents as of 2010. With a median household income of $9,286 (compared to $44,758 for the state), Oak Hill is the poorest community in Alabama.

Geography

Oak Hill is located at  (31.925246, -87.082645).

Demographics

2020 census

Note: the US Census treats Hispanic/Latino as an ethnic category. This table excludes Latinos from the racial categories and assigns them to a separate category. Hispanics/Latinos can be of any race.

2000 Census
As of the census of 2000, there were 37 people, 10 households, and 9 families residing in the town. The racial makeup of the town was 64.86% Black or African American and 35.14% White.

Out of ten households, 40.0% had children under the age of 18 living with them, 70.0% were married couples living together, and 10.0% were non-families. No households were made up of individuals, and none had someone living alone who was 65 years of age or older. The average household size was 3.70 and the average family size was 3.78.

In the town, the population was spread out, with 27.0% under the age of 18, 10.8% from 18 to 24, 27.0% from 25 to 44, 32.4% from 45 to 64, and 2.7% who were 65 years of age or older. The median age was 30 years. For every 100 females, there were 85.0 males. For every 100 females age 18 and over, there were 125.0 males.

The median income for a household in the town was $31,250, and the median income for a family was $31,250. Males had a median income of $33,750 versus $0 for females. The per capita income for the town was $7,659. There were no families and none of the population living below the poverty line, including no under eighteens and none of those over 64.

Notable person
Benjamin M. Miller, Governor of Alabama from 1931 to 1935

References

Towns in Alabama
Towns in Wilcox County, Alabama